Peter Beckers (3 October 1947 – 6 June 1996) was a Scottish professional footballer who played as a winger.

References

1947 births
1996 deaths
Footballers from Dundee
Scottish footballers
Association football wingers
Grimsby Town F.C. players
Skegness Town A.F.C. players
English Football League players